Wilson Pass is a glacier pass at about 400 m, running NW-SE between Bowditch Crests and Rock Pile Peaks on Bermel Peninsula, Bowman Coast of Antarctica.  The pass leads from Solberg Inlet to Mobiloil Inlet. The feature was photographed from the air by Lincoln Ellsworth, 1935, the United States Antarctic Service (USAS), 1939–41, and Ronne Antarctic Research Expedition (RARE), 1947–48. Named after Alison Wilson, of the Center for Polar Archives, National Archives, Washington, DC, who has been associated with Antarctic research from 1957; member, U.S. Advisory Committee on Antarctic Names, 1974–94; Chair, 1986–93.

References

Mountain passes of Graham Land
Bowman Coast